Goodwin Sports Centre is a sporting facility and gym in the Crookesmoor area of the city of Sheffield, South Yorkshire, England.  Its facilities include a 33 m swimming pool, bouldering wall, tennis court, cricket nets, gymnasium (known as S10health), sports hall and several synthetic pitches.  It is owned by the University of Sheffield.

Facilities

The Goodwin Sports Centre consists of a range of indoor facilities in two buildings - one housing a swimming pool, gym and bouldering wall, the other housing an indoor sports hall and other facilities.  The complex also has one full size astroturf hockey pitch on the other side of Northumberland Road and a football synthetic pitch.

The facilities are used by members of the general public as well as the university community.  University teams compete both at an internal level and within the British Universities Sports Association's leagues.  Also, a number of non-university teams and clubs play or train at Goodwin, including Sheffield University Bankers Hockey Club.

History
The facilities were largely constructed in the 1960s, funded by the head of the Neepsend Tool and Steel Corporation, Sir Stuart Goodwin.  He approached the university with £30,000 of financial support towards building a sports hall after discovering that the existing gymnasium on the Western Bank part of the campus would be demolished.  They were opened in October 1960.  After funding the indoor sports hall, Goodwin then discovered that there was no swimming facility at the university (plans had been abandoned in 1939) and issued a further £60,000 from himself and his wife to fund the construction.  At the opening ceremony for the pool, he surprised people further by pledging to fund squash courts and indoor cricket wickets.  The swimming pool and second gymnasium opened in 1963.

The swimming pool was later named the Cofield Swimming Pool, after "Sarge Cofield", the manager of university athletics for several years, on his retirement in 1967.

During the 2001/2002 academic year, the facilities were improved at a cost of £6 million, and the gym facilities renamed S10 Health.  This is when additional synthetic pitches were added, along with the aerobics area and indoor climbing arena.  This was also when the 'USport' body was created, an organisation with input from the University of Sheffield and the University of Sheffield Union of Students.  The facilities were then opened up to members of the public, and membership fees were charged - including fees for students - for the first time.  USport was renamed to Sport Sheffield in 2012.

Location
Goodwin is located roughly halfway up Northumberland Road off the A57 in the Crookesmoor part of Broomhill.  The hockey pitches are to the south of the road, opposite the Weston Park Hospital whereas the indoor facilities and remaining football pitch are to the north, closer to Crookes Valley Park.

The pitches sit on top of former water reservoirs:  The sports pitches on Whitham Road opposite Weston Park Hospital are the site of Godfrey Dam, built in 1790 and extended in 1853. On the opposite side of Northumberland Road was New Dam built in 1787 and enlarged in 1809. Nearer Crookesmoor Road alongside Narrow Walk were Ralphs and Misfortune Dams, with Butchers Dam on the opposite side of Northumberland Road.

References

External links
 Sport Sheffield

Sports venues in Sheffield
Sheffield University buildings and structures